Hatim Far (born 16 February 2002) is a French professional footballer who plays as a forward for  club Paris 13 Atletico on loan from Rodez.

Club career
Far began his senior career with the reserves of Troyes, before joining Rodez in the summer of 2021. He made his professional debut with Rodez in a 3–0 Ligue 2 win over Quevilly on 30 October 2021.

On 26 January 2023, Far was loaned to Paris 13 Atletico.

Personal life
Born in France, Far is of Algerian descent.

References

External links
 

2002 births
French sportspeople of Algerian descent
Living people
French footballers
Association football forwards
Rodez AF players
Paris 13 Atletico players
Ligue 2 players
Championnat National players
Championnat National 3 players